Tverrfjellet is a mountain in Dovre Municipality in Innlandet county, Norway. The mountain is surrounded by several other notable mountains including Einøvlingseggen to the west and Snøhetta and Brunkollen to the northwest.

See also
List of mountains of Norway

References

Dovre
Mountains of Innlandet